BMFC may refer to:

Bacchus Marsh Football Club
Bengal Mumbai FC
Black Mambas F.C.
Blackers Mill F.C.